Remember Me is a British drama television serial that premiered on BBC One in autumn 2014. Written by Gwyneth Hughes, the three-part mystery was made by Mammoth Screen. Michael Palin plays the lead role, making it his first regular television acting role in 20 years.

Plot
The elderly Tom Parfitt (Michael Palin) fakes a fall at his long-term terraced house in Yorkshire, to escape to a care home. However, moments after arriving the social worker that delivered Tom is thrown from the seemingly impenetrable fourth floor window of Tom's room, with only her and the frail Tom inside. This mystifies teenaged care assistant Hannah (Jodie Comer), although local police, including depressed detective Rob Fairholme (Mark Addy) are largely uninterested. One by one, strange things begin happening to those in contact with Tom, including Hannah and her family, and Tom soon vanishes from his hospital bed without explanation. Returning to Tom's home, Hannah starts to piece together several clues that lead her to Scarborough, where a dark secret from Tom's past comes to light and it becomes apparent that the paranormal is moving against them.

Cast

Production
In February 2013, the series was commissioned by Ben Stephenson and Danny Cohen for BBC One. Filming began in January 2014 in Huddersfield and Scarborough. The series is produced by Chris Carey and directed by Ashley Pearce. Funding was provided by ITV GE and North Light Film Studios. The British Film Institute issued a tax break on the series. It started airing Sunday 23 November 2014 at 9pm. The series consisted of one run of three episodes.

Foreign broadcasts
The series was shown in the US on PBS in summer 2017.

References

External links

2010s British drama television series
2010s British horror television series
2014 British television series debuts
2014 British television series endings
BBC television dramas
English-language television shows
Scarborough, North Yorkshire
Television series by Mammoth Screen
Television shows set in the United Kingdom
Television shows set in Yorkshire
Works about old age